The 1977 Asian Basketball Confederation Championship for Men were held in Kuala Lumpur, Malaysia.

Preliminary round

Group A

Group B

Group C

Final round

Classification 7th–14th
 The results and the points of the matches between the same teams that were already played during the preliminary round shall be taken into account for the classification round.

Championship

Final standing

Awards

References
 Results
 archive.fiba.com

Asia Championship, 1977
1977
B
B
November 1977 sports events in Asia
December 1977 sports events in Asia